Antoine Goulard (born 18 December 1985) is a French professional footballer.

Career
After terminating his contract with Dijon FCO the 24-year-old defender joined to FC Rouen.

References

1985 births
Living people
French footballers
Ligue 2 players
Dijon FCO players
Association football defenders